George Crownshaw (17 April 1908 – October 1992) was a professional footballer who played for Huddersfield Town & Luton Town. He was born in Sheffield, South Yorkshire.

References

1908 births
1992 deaths
Footballers from Sheffield
English footballers
Association football midfielders
English Football League players
Huddersfield Town A.F.C. players
Luton Town F.C. players